Ali ibn Hatim al-Hamidi was the fourth Tayyibi Isma'ili Dāʿī al-Muṭlaq in Yemen, from 1199 to his death in 1209.

Life
He was chosen by his father, Hatim ibn Ibrahim, as his successor on the recommendation of Hatim's maʾdhūn (the senior deputy to the Dāʿī), Ali ibn Muhammad ibn al-Walid, who had been his tutor. When Hatim died in 1199, Ali succeeded him, still with Ali ibn Muhammad as his maʾdhūn. 

During his tenure he was forced to move the headquarters of the Tayyibi daʿwa from the fortress of Haraz to Sanaa, because the Ya'buri family ruling Haraz fell into fratricidal conflict and turned against the Tayyibis. The Hamdanids of San'a' welcomed him, and their overlords, the Ayyubids, did not oppose his presence in the city.

Syedna Ali later moved to Zimarmar but was taken back to San'a' when he fell ill.

Death
Ali died on 31 May 1209, and with him ended the Hamidi line. He was succeeded by Ali ibn Muhammad, who founded the Banu al-Walid al-Anf line of Tayyibi Dāʿīs.

He is buried in San'a', Yemen but the site of his grave is unknown.

References

Sources
 
 

Yemeni Ismailis
Tayyibi da'is
12th-century births
Year of birth unknown
1209 deaths
12th century in Yemen
13th century in Yemen
12th-century Arabs
13th-century Arabs
12th-century Ismailis
13th-century Ismailis
12th-century Islamic religious leaders
13th-century Islamic religious leaders